Associazione Calcio Milan won two trophies in the 1992–93 season, which was crowned when it reached the European Cup final and won the domestic league for the second year running.

None of the other Serie A teams came close to challenging Milan in the league, with new signing Jean-Pierre Papin playing a vital role in the absence of lethal striker Marco van Basten, who albeit scored 13 goals in just 15 matches. Some defensive slips were redeemed by the 65 goals scored, which was the most of all teams in the league, and enough to clinch the title in front of city rivals Internazionale by four points. The season also saw memorable displays against Pescara, Fiorentina and Lazio in the beginning of the season. Against Pescara, Milan won 5–4 away from home, then beat Fiorentina 7–3 and Lazio at home by 5–3. In those three matches, van Basten totaled seven goals. Milan also crushed Napoli 5–1 at the Stadio San Paolo in Naples, with van Basten scoring four goals in Serie A for the first (and only) time.

The season also saw Milan set the world transfer record following an intensive bidding battle against Juventus to sign Gianluigi Lentini from 1992's surprise Torino team. Lentini did not perform to expectations, and was considered a disappointment, especially following a car accident in 1993, from which he recovered, but never rediscovered his form prior to the accident.

Squad

Transfers

Winter

Competitions

Serie A

League table

Results by round

Matches

Top scorers
  Marco van Basten 13
  Jean-Pierre Papin 13
  Ruud Gullit 7
  Gianluigi Lentini 7
  Daniele Massaro 5
  Marco Simone 5
  Dejan Savićević 4

Coppa Italia

Second round

Third round

Quarter-finals

Semi-finals

Supercoppa Italiana

European Cup

First round

Second round

UEFA Champions League

Final

Statistics

Players statistics

References

A.C. Milan seasons
Milan
1993